Sir Arne's Treasure is a 1954 Swedish drama film directed by Gustaf Molander. It is based on Selma Lagerlöf's novel The Treasure which had previously been filmed in 1919.

Cast
 Ulla Jacobsson as Elsalill
 Ulf Palme as Sir Archie
 Carl-Hugo Calander as Sir Filip
 Bengt Eklund as Sir Reginald
 Hugo Björne as Herr Arne
 Tekla Sjöblom as Herr Arne's Wife
 Bibi Andersson as Berghild
 Anders Henrikson as Torarin
 Aurore Palmgren as Mor Kajsa
 Ingemar Pallin as Priest
 Gunnar Sjöberg as King Johan III
 Claes Thelander as Charles de Mornay
 Hans Strååt as Captain

References

External links
 

1954 films
1954 drama films
Swedish drama films
Films directed by Gustaf Molander
1950s Swedish-language films
Films based on works by Selma Lagerlöf
1950s Swedish films